The W86 was an American earth-penetrating ("bunker buster") nuclear warhead, intended for use on the Pershing II intermediate-range ballistic missile (IRBM). The W86 design was canceled in September 1980 when the Pershing II missile mission shifted from destroying hardened targets to targeting soft targets at greater range. The W85 warhead, which had been developed in parallel with the W86, was used for all production Pershing II missiles.

Development work for the W86's penetrator case began in 1975 at Sandia National Laboratories. The weapon was intended to allow for the destruction of hardened structures and the cratering of runways while using smaller yields.

Design
The warhead was developed from Los Alamos nuclear artillery shell technologies.

A 2005 study by the National Research Council that examined a number of nuclear earth penetrating weapon proposals, described the W86 as being  in diameter and weighing . The study cites the development report for the W86 warhead for its figures.

Development called for approximately 20 tests of the penetrator into various mediums.

The weapon was an implosion-type weapon.

Gallery

See also
 List of nuclear weapons
 B61 nuclear bomb
 Pershing II

References 

 W86 Warhead Status Report (U), SAND 83-1642, RS 3151/83/033, Sandia National Laboratories, Albuquerque, N.Mex. 1983

Nuclear technology
Nuclear warheads of the United States